Marth Mariam Cathedral is the cathedral of the Chaldean Syrian Church of India, part of the Assyrian Church of the East. It is located in Thrissur City in the state of Kerala, It is the city's first Christian church inside the fort gates and is the fourth church in the Thrissur Municipal Corporation

The church established in 1814 by Sakthan Thampuran, the maharajah of Cochin, for the Chaldaya Suriyani Nasrani (Ancient Indian Christian community) whom he invited to live in Thrissur to strengthen the trade sector of the new city. The church was or

A group supporting Chaldean Catholic bishop Elias Mellus was based in Our Lady of Dolours. They eventually broke with the Catholic hierarchy and formed the Chaldean Syrian Church which is part of the universal Assyrian Church of the East. They retained the Our Lady of Dolours building, but renamed it Mart Mariam. Mart Mariam church, Thrissur now serves as the cathedral of the Chaldean Syrian Church of India which is part of the universal Assyrian Church of the East.

See also
List of cathedrals in India

References

Sources

External links

 

Assyrian Church of the East churches
Church of the East in India
Churches in Thrissur
Tourist attractions in Thrissur
1814 establishments in British India
Cathedrals in Kerala